The Most Noble Order of the Crown of Thailand is a Thai order, established in 1869 by King Rama V of The Kingdom of Siam (now Thailand) for Thais, the royal family, governmental employees, and foreign dignitaries for their outstanding services to the Kingdom of Thailand. The order originally had seven classes. The special class was added by King Rama VI in 1918. Formerly called The Most Noble Order of the Crown of Siam.

Classes 
The Order consists of eight classes:

Gallery

Old designs

Current designs

Selected recipients 
Thai Recipients
General 
General Apirat Kongsompong
General Chalermchai Sitthisart
General Thirachai Nakwanich
General Udomdej Sitabutr
General Prayut Chan-o-cha
General Anupong Paochinda
General Sonthi Boonyaratglin
General Prawit Wongsuwan
General Chaiyasit Shinawatra
General 
General Surayud Chulanont
General 
General 
General 
General Isarapong Noonpakdee
General Suchinda Kraprayoon
General Chavalit Yongchaiyudh
General Arthit Kamlang-ek
General 
General Prem Tinsulanonda
General 
General 
General Kris Sivara
Field Marshal Praphas Charusathien
Field Marshal Thanom Kittikachorn
Field Marshal Sarit Thanarat
Field Marshal Phin Choonhavan
General 
Lieutenant General Phichit Kriangsakphichit
General Phraya Phahonphonphayuhasena
Admiral Somprasong Nilsamai
Admiral Chatchai Sriworakan
Admiral Luechai Ruddit
Admiral Naris Pratoomsuwan
Admiral Na Arreenich
Admiral Kraisorn Chansuvanich
Admiral Narong Pipathanasai
Admiral Surasak Runroengrom
Admiral 
Admiral Sathiraphan Keyanon
Admiral Samphop Amprapal
Admiral 
Admiral Taweesak Somapha
Admiral Prasert Boonsong
Admiral 
Admiral Suwatchai Kasemsook
Admiral Wichit Chamnankarn
Admiral Prajet Siradej
Admiral 
Admiral 
Admiral Thada Ditthabanchong
Admiral Niphon Sirithorn
Admiral Praphat Chantawirat
Admiral Somboon Chuaphiboon
Admiral 
Admiral 
Admiral 
Admiral Sangad Chaloryu
Admiral Cherdchai Thomya
Admiral 
Admiral 
Admiral Jaroon Chalermtian
Admiral Prince 
Admiral Sawat Phutianands
Admiral Luang Chamnanarthayutha
Admiral of the Fleet Prayoon Yuthasastrkosol
Admiral Luang Pholasinthanawat
Admiral 
Rear Admiral Phraya 
Captain Phraya 
Rear Admiral Phraya 
Air Chief Marshal Napadej Thupatemi
Air Chief Marshal Airbull Suthiwan
Air Chief Marshal Manat Wongwat
Air Chief Marshal Chaiyapruek Didyasarin
Air Chief Marshal Johm Rungsawang
Air Chief Marshal Treetod Sonjance
Air Chief Marshal Prajin Juntong
Air Chief Marshal Itthaporn Subhawong
Air Chief Marshal Chalit Pukbhasuk
Air Chief Marshal Chalerm Choomchuensook
Air Chief Marshal Kongsak Wandana
Air Chief Marshal 
Air Chief Marshal Sanan Tuatip
Air Chief Marshal Thanatip Niamtan
Air Chief Marshal 
Air Chief Marshal Mom Rajawongse Siripong Thongyai
Air Chief Marshal 
Air Chief Marshal Kaset Rojananil
Air Chief Marshal 
Air Chief Marshal 
Air Chief Marshal 
Air Chief Marshal Panieng Karntarat
Air Chief Marshal 
Air Chief Marshal 
Marshal of the Royal Thai Air Force Chalermkiat Vatthanangkun
Marshal of the Royal Thai Air Force Fuen Ronnaphagrad Ritthakhanee
Air Marshal Luang Tevaritpanluek
Air Marshal Luang 
Air Marshal 
Colonel Phraya Vehasayan Silapasit
Major General Phraya Chalerm Akas
General Chalermpol Srisawat
General Pornpipat Benyasri
General Thanchaiyan Srisuwan
General 
General 
General 
General Thanasak Patimaprakorn
General Songkitti Jaggabatara
General 
General Ruangroj Mahasaranon
General Chaiyasit Shinawatra 
General 
General Surayud Chulanont
Admiral 
General 
General 
General 
General 
Air Chief Marshal  
Air Chief Marshal Kaset Rojananil
General Suchinda Kraprayoon
General Sunthorn Kongsompong
General Chavalit Yongchaiyudh
Admiral 
General Arthit Kamlang-ek
General 
General 
General Kriangsak Chamanan
Air Chief Marshal 
Admiral Sangad Chaloryu
General Kris Sivara
Air Chief Marshal Dawee Chullasapya
Field Marshal Thanom Kittikachorn
Field Marshal Sarit Thanarat
Field Marshal Plaek Phibunsongkhram
General 
General 
General 
General 
General 
General 
General 
General 
General 
General 
General Apichart Penkitti
General 
General Sirichai Thanyasiri
General Ood Ongbon
General 
General Thawat Kesangkun
General Teeradej Meepien
General Yuthasak Sasiprapha
General Paiboon Emphan
General Prasert Sararit
Air Chief Marshal 
General Wanchai Ruangtrakul
General Wichit Wichitsongkram
Air Chief Marshal Sansern Vanich
General Prayoon Bunnag
General Chamnan Nilwises
General Tuanthong Suwannathat
General Thep Kranlert
First Class
General Michael E. Ryan, USAF
Vice Admiral Ian MacDougall, AC, AFSM, RAN
General Md Hashim Bin Hussein, RMA
Senior General Min Aung Hlaing, Commander in Chief, Myanmar Armed Forces
Ambassador Kiyoshi Sumiya
Francis B. Sayre
Lieutenant Colonel (ret.) Senator Tammy Duckworth, USA
Pakubowono X, Susuhunan of Surakarta
General Endriartono Sutarto, Commander of the Indonesian National Armed Forces
Air Chief Marshal Siboen Dipoatmodjo, Chief of Staff of the Indonesian Air Force
Admiral Tedjo Edhy Purdijatno, Chief of Staff of the Indonesian Navy
General R. Hartono, Chief of Staff of the Indonesian Army 
General Try Sutrisno, Vice President of Indonesia 
General Djoko Santoso, Commander of the Indonesian National Armed Forces 
Police-General Hoegeng Iman Santoso, Chief of the Indonesian National Police
Air Chief Marshal Imam Sufaat, Chief of Staff of the Indonesian Air Force
Admiral Sudomo, Chief of Staff of the Indonesian Navy
Air Chief Marshal Agus Supriatna, Chief of Staff of the Indonesian Air Force
Air Chief Marshal Soerjadi Soerjadarma, Commander of the Indonesian National Armed Forces (Special Class)
Ismail Al-Khalidi, Sultan of Johor
Major General Halbi Mohd Yussof, Commander of the Royal Brunei Armed Forces
Lieutenant General Melvyn Ong Su Kiat, Chief of Defence Force of the
Singapore Armed Forces
Lieutenant General Perry Lim Cheng Yeow, Chief of Defence Force of the
Singapore Armed Forces
Lieutenant General Ng Chee Meng, Chief of Defence Force of the
Singapore Armed Forces
Lieutenant General Neo Kian Hong, Chief of Defence Force of the
Singapore Armed Forces
Lieutenant General Desmond Kuek Bak Chye, Chief of Defence Force of the
Singapore Armed Forces
Lieutenant General General Ng Yat Chung, Chief of Defence Force of the
Singapore Armed Forces
Lieutenant General Winston Choo Wee Leong, Chief of Defence Force of the
Singapore Armed Forces

References

External links

 The Most Noble Order of the Crown of Thailand, Secretariat to the Cabinet of Thailand

Crown Of Thailand, Order Of The
Crown Of Thailand, Order Of The
Crown Of Thailand, Order Of The
1869 establishments in Siam